"Beautiful Hangover" is a single by the South Korean hip-hop group Big Bang. "Beautiful Hangover" is sung in Japanese and English. It was released on August 25, 2010. The music video has two versions: an advised and revised. This song (and the b-side) was then added to BigBang's second Japanese album, Big Bang 2 (2011).

Music video
The video was filmed in July 2010. The advised version premiered August 10, 2010, and was played on night-time television only, but was played on headliner. The revised (re-edited) version premiered on August 24, 2010.

The video is dark and muted; the neutral colors and many visible cameras give it a smoky look. The story shows Taeyang, hurt by a relationship with a beautiful but careless girl, being tempted to take drugs from Daesung's character. G-Dragon appears to have already been broken by this same mysterious girl, and is already addicted to the drugs. During his verse, Seungri is shown seeming to control and observe Daesung and Taeyang from a white room full of computer screens. The screens also show T.O.P sitting in a dark office. Taeyang also dances in a great white room with pulsing grey dots in the air, and another room full of hanging cameras. The "drugs" that Daesung tries to convince Taeyang to take are frequently seen, also with Seungri.  Taeyang is seen finally succumbing to Daesung.

A revised version was made, but it did not show clips of Taeyang dancing with the grey dots, but new scenes of him dancing with the cameras was shown instead. It was heavily edited, along with a scene of a hand holding alcohol.

Track listing

Charts

Release history

References

External links
 
Big Bang Official Website
Big Bang Japan Official Website
Big Bang by Universal Music Japan

BigBang (South Korean band) songs
2010 singles
YG Entertainment singles
Universal Music Japan singles
Japanese-language songs
Songs written by G-Dragon
2010 songs